New Zealand national rugby team may refer to national teams in the different varieties of rugby:

 New Zealand national rugby union team, better known as the All Blacks, administered by the New Zealand Rugby Football Union.
 New Zealand national rugby sevens team compete in the World Sevens Series
 New Zealand national rugby league team, often nicknamed the Kiwis, administered by New Zealand Rugby League.